The Marvelous Midos Machine is a series of Orthodox Jewish children's audiotapes by Abie Rotenberg and Moshe Yess. The series follows the science fiction adventures of rabbi-scientist Dr. Midos, who teaches Jewish values like Torah study, respect for the elderly, and the avoidence of sinas ḥinom (baseless hatred).

Volumes
 Episode 1: Up Up and Away (1986)
 Episode 2: Shnooky to the Rescue (1987)
 Episode 3: Does Anyone Have the Time? (1988)
 Episode 4: Shnooky's Bar Mitzvah (2011)

References

1986 albums
1987 albums
1988 albums
2011 albums
Children's music albums by American artists
Children's music albums by Canadian artists
Jewish education in North America
Jewish music
Religious music albums by American artists
Religious music albums by Canadian artists
Science fiction albums